Born Romantic is a 2000 British film directed by David Kane. The film is centered on a salsa club and depicts four love stories. Fergus is trying to find the one he left behind on the eve of their wedding, charmer and Rat Pack fanatic Frankie woos the beautiful Eleanor and the robber Eddie falls hopelessly in love with dowdy cemetery worker Jocelyn. Meanwhile, taxi driver Jimmy is transporting all of them and dealing with a love story of his own.

Plot
Salsa dancing and 'El Corazon', a London Salsa Club provide the backdrop for the love-inspired efforts of three unlikely romantics:

Fergus (David Morrissey), who arrives in London from his native Liverpool, on a search for Maureen ('Mo') Docherty (Jane Horrocks), the high-school sweetheart he jilted years ago.

Eddie (Jimi Mistry), the incompetent mugger who falls for Jocelyn (Catherine McCormack), the neurotic "absentee grave tender" (she tends the graves of loved ones for people who cannot).

Frankie (Craig Ferguson), a hopeless romantic trapped in the fifties and still sharing a house with his ex. He pursues the elegant and snobbish Eleanor (Olivia Williams), art restorer by day and Salsa dancer by night.

All are connected by Jimmy (Adrian Lester), a cab driver, and a place, 'El Corazon'.

Cast
 Craig Ferguson as Frankie
 Jane Horrocks as Mo
 Adrian Lester as Jimmy
 Catherine McCormack as Jocelyn
 Jimi Mistry as Eddie
 David Morrissey as Fergus
 Olivia Williams as Eleanor
 Kenneth Cranham as Barney
 John Thomson as First Cab Driver
 Ian Hart as Second Cab Driver
 Paddy Considine as Ray
 Hermione Norris as Carolanne
 Sally Phillips as Suzy
 Jessica Hynes as Libby
 Ashley Walters as Lee

Production notes
The film features various London locations, including the interior of the British Museum.

The interior scenes of the Salsa club 'El Corazon' were filmed in a real Salsa club called the Loughborough Hotel in Loughborough Road, Brixton, South London, now a converted block of flats.

Also all the Salsa dancers were club members who participated in the film as extras.

The soundtrack includes a number of Latin dance hits:
 "Píntame",  performed by Elvis Crespo
 "Acuyuye", performed by DLG
 "Ella Fue" performed by Fania All-Stars
 "Yo No Como Camaron" performed by Saoco
 "Oye Como Va" performed by Cheo Feliciano
 "Bururu Barara" performed by Fruko y sus Tesos
 "Ran Kan Kan" performed by Tito Puente
 "Ojalá" performed by Kassav
 "La Engandora" performed by Ruben Gonzalez
 "Yamulemau" performed by Joe Arroyo
 "Como Ves" performed by Ozomatli
 "La Bomba" performed by Ricky Martin
 "Indestructible" performed by Robby Salinas
 "L.O.V.E." performed by Craig Ferguson
 "Sway" performed by Dean Martin
 "Baby Won't You Please Come Home" performed by Jane Horrocks and Dean Martin
 "Fear & Love" performed by Morcheeba
 "Doin Jobz 4 Tha Mob" performed by Pigforce
 "Yes Sir I Can Boogie" performed by Nina Miranda
 "My Own High" performed by Shiver

References

External links
 
 
 
 
 

2000 films
United Artists films
Films set in London
Films shot in London
British romantic comedy films
2000 romantic comedy films
Salsa
2000s English-language films
2000s British films